Named after Thomas Huston, Hustontown is situated in Dublin and Taylor Townships in northern Fulton County, Pennsylvania, United States at the intersection of Pennsylvania Routes 475 and 655. Despite the community's spelling, Huston is pronounced as Houston (in the same manner as the Texas city).

References

Unincorporated communities in Fulton County, Pennsylvania
Unincorporated communities in Pennsylvania